Dwight Webster Harrison (born October 12, 1948) is a retired American football defensive back and wide receiver who played ten seasons in the National Football League (NFL) for the Denver Broncos, Buffalo Bills, Baltimore Colts, and Oakland Raiders. 

Born and raised in Beaumont, Texas, he played college football at Texas A&I University—now Texas A&M University–Kingsville.

Harrison was selected in the second round of the 1971 NFL Draft (35th overall) by the Denver Broncos.

Harrison suffers from severe post-concussion syndrome, including severe depression, and was said to be living in a trailer in Texas without running water. His NFL pension had been cut off, and in August of this year, he was one of the plaintiffs in a concussion lawsuit against the NFL.

Harrison continues to fight for benefits NFL took away for the last 21 years.

References

External links
 

1948 births
Living people
American football cornerbacks
American football wide receivers
Baltimore Colts players
Buffalo Bills players
Denver Broncos players
Oakland Raiders players
Texas A&M–Kingsville Javelinas football players
Sportspeople from Beaumont, Texas
Players of American football from Texas